Koshevanka is a rural locality (a selo) in Altynzharsky Selsoviet of Volodarsky District, Astrakhan Oblast, Russia. The population was 321 as of 2010. There are 4 streets.

Geography 
It is located on the Karazhar River, 22 km south of Volodarsky (the district's administrative centre) by road. Tumak is the nearest rural locality.

References 

Rural localities in Volodarsky District, Astrakhan Oblast